Bon Accord may refer to:

Australia 

 Bon Accord, Queensland, a locality in the North Burnett Region
 Bon Accord railway station, a closed railway station in New South Wales

Canada 

 Bon Accord, Alberta, a town

Caribbean 

Bon Accord, Trinidad and Tobago
Bon Accord River, Grenada

Scotland 

Bon Accord (motto), the ancient motto of Aberdeen
Bon Accord Centre, a shopping centre complex in Aberdeen
Bon Accord Free Church, an Aberdeen congregation of the Free Church of Scotland
Bon Accord F.C., a former Aberdeen football (soccer) club
Shotts Bon Accord F.C., a Scottish football (soccer) club

South Africa 

 Bon Accord Dam, Gauteng, South Africa